In mathematics, a locally cyclic group is a group (G, *) in which every finitely generated subgroup is cyclic.

Some facts
 Every cyclic group is locally cyclic, and every locally cyclic group is abelian.
 Every finitely-generated locally cyclic group is cyclic.
 Every subgroup and quotient group of a locally cyclic group is locally cyclic.
 Every homomorphic image of a locally cyclic group is locally cyclic.
 A group is locally cyclic if and only if every pair of elements in the group generates a cyclic group.
 A group is locally cyclic if and only if its lattice of subgroups is distributive .
 The torsion-free rank of a locally cyclic group is 0 or 1.
 The endomorphism ring of a locally cyclic group is commutative.

Examples of locally cyclic groups that are not cyclic

Examples of abelian groups that are not locally cyclic

References

.

.

Abelian group theory
Properties of groups